Paddison is a surname.

List of people with the surname 
 Gareth Paddison (born 1980), New Zealand professional golfer
 Garry Paddison, New Zealand footballer
 Geoffrey Paddison (1925–1972), English singer
 George L. Paddison (1883–1954), American academic
 Thomas Paddison (born 1883), Welsh professional rugby league footballer

See also 

 Maddison
 Addison (name)

Surnames
Surnames of British Isles origin
English-language surnames
Surnames of English origin